The Waterloo Challenger, last sponsored as Cooper Challenger (also previously known as the WOW Tennis Challenger from 2008 to 2011), was a professional tennis tournament played on outdoor clay courts. The event was classified as a $50,000 ITF Women's Circuit tournament and was held in Waterloo, Ontario, Canada from 2008 to 2013.

Past finals

Singles

Doubles

External links
Official website

 
ITF Women's World Tennis Tour
Tennis tournaments in Canada
Defunct tennis tournaments in Canada
Clay court tennis tournaments
Sport in Waterloo, Ontario
Tennis in Ontario
Recurring sporting events established in 2008
Recurring sporting events disestablished in 2013
2008 establishments in Ontario
2013 disestablishments in Ontario